Carlin How is a village in the borough of Redcar and Cleveland and the ceremonial county of North Yorkshire, England.

Notable people
Alfred Myers, ironstone miner, one of the Richmond Sixteen

References

External links

Villages in North Yorkshire
Places in the Tees Valley
Loftus, North Yorkshire